Rodolfo Rafael Dias Lourenço (born 15 July 1991) is a retired Portuguese footballer who played as a defender.

Football career

Rodolfo started his career at Sertanense, where he played a single season in the Campeanato de Portugal before transferring on a free deal to Associação Desportiva Nogueirense on 30 July 2012. He stayed at Nogueirense for 3 years, making over 75 appearances for the club between 2012 and 2015. On 30 July 2012 he made a free transfer to Segunda liga side S.C. Olhanense, for who he currently applies his trade. He made his debut for Olhanense in a 2015–16 Taça da Liga match versus F.C. Penafiel, which they ended up losing 2–0. He has been a regular starter in his initial season for S.C. Olhanense.

Personal
He is the younger brother of Fausto Lourenço.

References

External links

Stats and profile at LPFP 

1991 births
Living people
People from Miranda do Corvo
Portuguese footballers
Association football defenders
Liga Portugal 2 players
G.D. Tourizense players
Sertanense F.C. players
A.D. Nogueirense players
S.C. Olhanense players
S.C. Freamunde players
G.D. Sourense players
Sportspeople from Coimbra District